Belemnia pavonia is a moth of the subfamily Arctiinae. It was described by William Trowbridge Merrifield Forbes in 1939. It is found in Panama.

References

Arctiini
Moths described in 1939